Ludger Fischer (born 30 October 1957 in Essen) is a German historian on building history, reviewer of contemporary architecture and political scientist.

Work
In 1986 Fischer received his doctorate with a dissertation "Über den Denkmalwert sogenannter Zweckbauten" [On the historical value of so-called functional buildings]. He published on castles at the Middle Rhine as Schönburg in Oberwesel and Rheinfels Castle in St. Goar. In his 2010 habilitation treatise Versuche baukünstlerischer Denkmalpflege [The attempts of artistic monument preservation] he examined the work of the architect Bodo Ebhardt (1865–1945). Since 1995 Fischer focuses on contemporary building in the Netherlands and Belgium. He has been a member of the “advisory group on food store chains” of the European Commission, member of the Stakeholder Consultative Platform of the European Food Safety Authority EFSA and several other EU-panels on food safety. Based on his work as political consultant in Brussels he publishes books on the chemical and physical conditions of cooking. Fischer lives in Brussels.

Reception
Fischer's work on Bodo Ebhardt's architecture regarding historical castles received a positive review in the bulletin of the Baden-Württemberg state office for the preservation of monuments. His books on the common errors of cooking practice were also well received by the German press including Frankfurter Rundschau, Financial Times and Hamburger Abendblatt.

Selected publications
 Audiobook.

As co-author

As editor

References

External links

Living people
1957 births
20th-century German historians
Writers from Essen
German male non-fiction writers
21st-century German historians